Ku. Alagirisami or G. Alagirisami (23 June 1923– 28 March 1949) was a Tamil writer from Tamil Nadu, India.

Biography
He was born in Idaicheval village near Kovilpatti. He was a childhood friend of Ki. Rajanarayanan. He completed his SSLC and worked as a teacher and then as a clerk in the registrar office. He later became a journalist and wrote for  Tamil publications like Tamil Mani, Sakthi and Prasanda Vikatan. His first short story Urakkam Kolluma was published in Ananda Bodhini in 1943. He became a sub-editor at Sakthi in 1947. He was a friend and contemporary of Vallikannan, Pudumaipithan and T. M. Chidambara Ragunathan. His first short story collection - Ku. Alagirisamy kathaigal was published in 1952 with a foreword from Kalki Krishnamurthy. In 1953, he went to Malaysia to work in Tamil Nesan. He married Seethalakshmi in 1955. During 1960-65 he worked as a sub-editor in Navasakthi. He freelanced during 1965-70. He worked at Soviet Nadu for a few months until his death. In 1967, the Government of Tamil Nadu's Tamil development department awarded a prize for his play Kavichakravarthi (lit. Emperor among poets). He was noted for his short stories. In 1970, he was awarded the Sahitya Akademi Award for Tamil posthumously for his short story collection Anbalippu.

Partial bibliography

Novels
Doctor Anuradha
Theerada Vilayattu
Puthu veedu puthu ulagam
Vaazhkai padhai

Children's fiction
Moonru pillaigal
Kaalivaram

Translations
*Laurence Binyon's Akbar

Maxim Gorky's books
Leninudan sila naatkal
Americavilae
Yutham vendaam
Virodhi
Paniyavittal

Plays
Vanja Magal
Kavichakravarthi

Short story collections
Anbalippu
Sirikkavillai
Thavappayan
Varaprasadham
Kaviyum kaadhalum
Sevisaykka oruvan
Pudhiya roja
Thuravu
ku. Alagirisami siruhathiakal (complete collection of short stories, April 2011)

Essay collections
Ilakkiya then
Thamizh thandha kaviyinbam
Thamizh thandha kavichelvam
Naan kanda ezhuthalargal

Notes

References

Further reading
Dinamani profile of Ku. Alagirisamy

1923 births
1970 deaths
Indian Tamil people
Recipients of the Sahitya Akademi Award in Tamil
Tamil writers
Children's writers in Tamil
People from Thoothukudi district
Writers from Tamil Nadu
20th-century Indian novelists
20th-century Indian essayists
20th-century Indian short story writers
20th-century Indian dramatists and playwrights
Indian children's writers